Frame is a surname. Notable people with the surname include:

Billy Frame (1912–1992), Scottish footballer
Esther G. Frame (1840-1920), American Quaker minister and evangelist
Fred Frame (1894–1962), American race car driver
Janet Frame (1924–2004), New Zealand writer
John Frame (1733–1796), English cricketer
John Frame (born 1939), American philosopher and theologian
Linley Frame (born 1971), Australian swimmer
Margaret Frame (1903–1985), Canadian painter
Margaret Frame, Scottish scientist
Pete Frame (born 1942),  English music journalist
Peter Frame (1957–2018), American ballet dancer
Roddy Frame (born 1964), Scottish singer-songwriter and musician (Aztec Camera)
Tom Frame (1931–2006), British comic letterer
Tom Frame (born 1962), Australian Anglican Bishop
William Frame (1848–1906), English architect
William Frame (cricketer) (1932–1965), New Zealand cricketer and murder-suicide perpetrator
Willie Frame (fl. 1920s), Scottish footballer for Clyde, Motherwell and Linfield
Willie Frame (curler), Scottish curler, European champion

Characters
Alice Frame  a character on the soap opera Another World
Steve Frame a character on the soap opera Another World